The 2013 U.S. National Indoor Tennis Championships was an ATP World Tour and WTA Tour event held at the hardcourts of the Racquet Club of Memphis in Memphis, Tennessee, United States. It was the 38th edition of the U.S. National Indoor Tennis Championships and the 28th edition of the Memphis WTA International Event. The U.S. National Indoor Tennis Championships is part of the ATP World Tour 500 series on the 2013 ATP World Tour, and the Memphis International is an International-level tournament on the 2013 WTA Tour. The event took place from February 16 to February 24, 2013. Kei Nishikori and Marina Erakovic won the singles titles.

Points and prize money

Point distribution

Prize money

* per team

ATP singles main-draw entrants

Seeds 

1 Rankings as of February 11, 2013.

Other entrants 
The following players received wildcards into the main draw:
 James Blake
 Steve Johnson
 Jack Sock

The following players received entry from the qualifying draw:
 Alex Bogomolov Jr.
 Illya Marchenko
 Rhyne Williams
 Donald Young

The following player received entry as a lucky loser:
 Michael Russell

Withdrawals
Before the tournament
  Kevin Anderson (elbow injury)
  Brian Baker (knee injury)
  Mardy Fish (heart problems)
  Blaž Kavčič
  Lukáš Lacko
  Fernando Verdasco (neck injury)
During the tournament
  Tommy Haas (illness)

Retirements
  Xavier Malisse (back injury)
  Marinko Matosevic (foot injury)

ATP doubles main-draw entrants

Seeds

1 Rankings are as of February 11, 2013.

Other entrants
The following pairs received wildcard into the doubles main draw:
  James Blake /  Jack Sock
  Christian Harrison /  Ryan Harrison
The following pairs received entry as alternates:
  Jaroslav Levinský /  Yen-Hsun Lu
  Xavier Malisse /  Marinko Matosevic

Withdrawals
Before the tournament
  John Isner (knee injury)
  Fernando Verdasco (neck injury)

WTA singles main-draw entrants

Seeds 

1 Rankings as of February 11, 2013.

Other entrants 
The following players received wildcards into the main draw:
 Courtney Collins
 Victoria Duval
 Garbiñe Muguruza

The following players received entry from the qualifying draw:
 Jana Čepelová
 Claire Feuerstein
 Madison Keys
 Maria Sanchez

Withdrawals
Before the tournament
 Anna Tatishvili

Retirements
 Sabine Lisicki (gastrointestinal illness)

WTA doubles main-draw entrants

Seeds

1 Rankings as of February 11, 2013.

Other entrants
The following pairs received wildcard into the doubles main draw:
  Stefanie Mikesz /  Caroline Wegner
  Taylor Townsend /  CoCo Vandeweghe
The following pairs received entry as alternates:
  Alyssa Hibberd /  Tiffany Welcher
  Ashley Murdock /  Mariya Słupska

Withdrawals
Before the tournament
  Ksenia Pervak (low back injury)
  Valeria Savinykh (right shoulder injury)

Finals

Men's singles

  Kei Nishikori defeated  Feliciano López, 6–2, 6–3

Women's singles

  Marina Erakovic defeated  Sabine Lisicki, 6–1, ret.

Men's doubles

  Bob Bryan /  Mike Bryan defearted  James Blake /  Jack Sock, 6–1, 6–2

Women's doubles

  Kristina Mladenovic /  Galina Voskoboeva defeated  Sofia Arvidsson /  Johanna Larsson, 7–6(7–5), 6–3

References

External links
 Official site

U.S. National Indoor Tennis Championships
U.S. National Indoor Tennis Championships
U.S. National Indoor Championships
U.S. National Indoor Tennis Championships
U.S. National Indoor Tennis Championships
U.S. National Indoor Tennis Championships